The Whispering Swarm (2015) is a fantasy novel by Michael Moorcock. It is the first in The Sanctuary of the White Friars series.

Friar Isidore is an honest-to-god monk, with a tonsure and everything. Michael meets Friar Isidore who introduces him to Alsacia, the secret heart of London.

Notes

External links

2015 British novels
Novels by Michael Moorcock
Tor Books books